Troy Elder OAM (born 15 October 1977 in Bunbury, Western Australia) is a field hockey striker and midfielder from Australia, who was a member of the Men's National Team that won the golden medal at the 2004 Summer Olympics in Athens. Four years earlier, when Sydney hosted the Olympic Games, Elder finished in third spot with The Kookaburras, as the national team is called.

Elder originated from Bundaberg, Queensland, where he played for the All Blacks Hockey Club. Nicknamed Woody, Elder shot into limelight as a player with the National Junior Squad, that won the Hockey Junior World Cup at Milton Keynes in 1997 against India. After the 1998 Australian Hockey League season with the Queensland Blades, Elder got into the senior National Squad at the 1998 Champions Trophy in Lahore, where Australia won the bronze. He was part of the winning team in the 1999 Champions Trophy at Brisbane.

Just like his countrymen Jay Stacy and Michael Brennan, Elder moved to the Netherlands, where he played club hockey for Eindhoven's Oranje Zwart, with whom he won the Dutch title in the spring of 2005. The price was high, because during the Dutch play-offs he neglected the call from Australia's Head Coach Barry Dancer to come over for a training session with the men's National Team. He therefore had to miss the 2005 Champions Trophy in Chennai and the 2006 Commonwealth Games in Melbourne.

Having retired from international hockey, Elder played club hockey for United Hockey in Brisbane for some time whilst still representing the Queensland Blades. A plumber by profession, he is fond of surfing and fishing.

References

External links

 Profile on Hockey Australia

1977 births
Olympic field hockey players of Australia
Australian male field hockey players
Male field hockey forwards
Male field hockey midfielders
Field hockey players at the 2000 Summer Olympics
2002 Men's Hockey World Cup players
Field hockey players at the 2004 Summer Olympics
2006 Men's Hockey World Cup players
Recipients of the Medal of the Order of Australia
People from Bunbury, Western Australia
Field hockey people from Western Australia
Living people
Olympic gold medalists for Australia
Olympic bronze medalists for Australia
Olympic medalists in field hockey
Medalists at the 2004 Summer Olympics
Medalists at the 2000 Summer Olympics
Commonwealth Games medallists in field hockey
Commonwealth Games gold medallists for Australia
Oranje Zwart players
Australian expatriate sportspeople in the Netherlands
Expatriate field hockey players
Field hockey players at the 2002 Commonwealth Games
Medallists at the 2002 Commonwealth Games